Key West is an island and city in the US state of Florida.

Key West may also refer to:

Places
 Key West International Airport
 Key West, Iowa, an unincorporated village in Dubuque County, Iowa
 Key West, Minnesota, an unincorporated community
 Rural Municipality of Key West No. 70, a rural municipality in Saskatchewan, Canada
 Qayyarah Airfield West, air force base in Iraq
 Key West, Virginia

Other
 Key West (Philosopher Pirate) is a song by Bob Dylan, which was published as the 9th track of Dylan' 2020 album Rough and Rowdy Ways
 Key West (TV series), a 1993 TV series created by David Beaird
 Key West (film), a 1973 TV film directed by Philip Leacock
 "Key West" (song), a 1978 song by the Village People
 USS Key West, several ships of the US Navy